Jacques Martin ( – April 19, 2012) was a paralympic athlete from Canada competing mainly in category F55 throwing events.

Biography
Martin was from Saint-Denis-de-Brompton, Quebec. Martin competed in every Paralympic Games from 1984 to Athens in 2004. In 1984 he won the shot put for class 4 athletes while also competing in the javelin and discus.  He improved on this feat in 1988, defending his gold in the shot and winning a bronze in the discus.  Although he did not win a third straight shot put competition in Barcelona in 1992, he still improved, winning the discus for the first time, winning his first medal in javelin, a silver, and finishing in the bronze medal position in the shot put.  In the 1996 Summer Paralympics he defended his discus gold medal and again won silver in the javelin.  The 2000 Summer Paralympics saw Martin pick up what would prove to be his last medal, a silver in the discus as he was unable to medal in either shot or javelin.  He was also unable to medal in either the discus or javelin at the 2004 Summer Paralympics.

Martin died April 19, 2012, of a heart attack.

References

2012 deaths
Paralympic track and field athletes of Canada
Athletes (track and field) at the 1984 Summer Paralympics
Athletes (track and field) at the 1988 Summer Paralympics
Athletes (track and field) at the 1992 Summer Paralympics
Athletes (track and field) at the 1996 Summer Paralympics
Athletes (track and field) at the 2000 Summer Paralympics
Athletes (track and field) at the 2004 Summer Paralympics
Paralympic gold medalists for Canada
Paralympic silver medalists for Canada
Paralympic bronze medalists for Canada
Date of birth missing
Year of birth uncertain
Medalists at the 1984 Summer Paralympics
Medalists at the 1988 Summer Paralympics
Medalists at the 1992 Summer Paralympics
Medalists at the 1996 Summer Paralympics
Medalists at the 2000 Summer Paralympics
Commonwealth Games medallists in athletics
Commonwealth Games silver medallists for Canada
Athletes (track and field) at the 2006 Commonwealth Games
Paralympic medalists in athletics (track and field)
Canadian male discus throwers
Canadian male shot putters
Wheelchair discus throwers
Wheelchair shot putters
Paralympic discus throwers
Paralympic shot putters
20th-century Canadian people
21st-century Canadian people
Medallists at the 2006 Commonwealth Games